HMAS Warreen was a survey vessel and general purpose vessel of the Royal Australian Navy (RAN). She served twice with the RAN, as HMAS Stella during World War II and as HMAS Warreen from 1952 until 1969.

Requisitioned
Launched in 1938 by the Melbourne Harbour Trust, Williamstown Dockyard, Victoria as MV Warreen for the Commonwealth Scientific and Industrial Research as a fisheries research vessel. She was requisitioned by the RAN on 1 October 1942, and after fitting out at Garden Island was commissioned on 22 October as HMAS Stella. She took part in the survey of the sea route from Milne Bay to Oro Bay, between the D'Entrecasteaux Islands and the New Guinea mainland for the proposed attack om Buna. Stella was paid off on 19 December 1945.

Stella was awarded the battle honour "New Guinea 1942-44".

Post-war
Recommissioned on 16 April 1952, as HMAS Warreen, in October 1952, Warreen was involved in Operation Hurricane, the British nuclear bomb test in the lagoon in the Montebello Islands off Western Australia’s Pilbara region.

She participated in survey work on the Great Barrier Reef.

Warreen was paid off on 31 March 1966. She was sold and converted to a prawn fishing vessel.

Notes

1938 ships
Ships built in Victoria (Australia)
Survey ships of the Royal Australian Navy